Les festes vénitiennes ("Venetian Festivities"), also spelled Les fêtes vénitiennes, is an opéra-ballet by the French composer André Campra. It consists of a prologue (later sometimes omitted, abridged or replaced) and three entrées (four or five in subsequent versions). All versions of the libretto are by Antoine Danchet. It was first performed on 17 June 1710 by the Académie royale de musique in the Salle du Palais-Royal in Paris. According to the usage of the time, it was originally simply billed as a "ballet", but it is one of the most important and successful instances of the new genre later classified by scholars as opéra-ballet, which had become popular in Paris around the end of the 17th century.

Performance history
At the beginning of the 18th century the Paris Opéra public was growing dissatisfied with the traditional "operatic fare consisting of lyric tragedies cast invariably in the mould created by Lully and Quinault", and the innovative nature of the opéra-ballet, with its realistic locations and characters, and its comic plots, was seen as a viable alternative. The format of the new genre was exceedingly flexible: each entrée had its own independent intrigue and characters, and the various acts were loosely linked together by a tenuous thread (in Les festes vénitiennes, the Venice location).

Campra and Danchet's opera proved incredibly popular from the beginning, and, through a trial and error approach, "it perpetuated itself to the point where new entrées were written to replace the acts that seemed to be losing their appeal". Between June and December 1710, Campra and Danchet experimented with a total of two prologues and eight entrées and the opera ran for several dozen performances, reaching its 51st mounting on 14 October when it was restructured in a version with a shortened prologue and four entrées (which were to become five in the following month of December).

After its unprecedented success in 1710-1711, the opera was regularly revived over the next half-century (in 1712, 1713, 1721, 1731-1732, 1740, 1750-1751 and 1759), the different entrées being swapped around at various times, and provided ample opportunity for almost all the major artists who appeared on the stage of the Paris Opéra in this period. Eventually, it chalked up the incredible number of about three hundred performances.

Roles

References
Notes

Sources
 Period scores:
Les Barquerolles Entrée, manuscript kept at and digitized by the Bibliothèque nationale de France (accessible for free online at Gallica - B.N.F.)
Feste Marine Entrée, manuscript kept at and digitized by the Bibliothèque nationale de France (accessible for free online at Gallica - B.N.F.)
Le Bal // nouvelle // entrée // ajoutée aux // festes // venitiennes // Par // M. Campra, manuscript kept at and digitized by the Bibliothèque nationale de France (accessible for free online at Gallica - B.N.F.)
Le triomphe de la folie , comedie mis [sic] en musique par Monsieur Campra, Paris, Ballard, 1711 (accessible for free online at Gallica - B.N.F.) 
 Les Festes Vénitiennes , Ballet en Musique, par Monsieur Campra, Maître de Musique de la Chappelle du Roy ; Représenté pour la premiere fois, par l'Academie Royale de Musique. Le Mardy dix-septiéme Juin 1710. Conforme à la Remise au Théâtre, du Jeudy 14 Juin 1731, Paris, Ballard, 1731 (accessible for free online at Gallica - B.N.F.)
 James R. Anthony, Fêtes vénitiennes, Les, in Stanley Sadie (ed.), The New Grove Dictionary of Opera, Grove (Oxford University Press), New York, 1997, II, pp. 175–176, 
 
 Jean-Nicolas de Francine (ed.), Recueil general des opera réprésentez par l'Academie Royale de Musique, depuis son etablissement. Tome dixième, Paris, Ballard, 1714, pp. 129–252 (accessible for free online in books.google)
 Théodore Lajarte, Bibliothèque Musicale du  Théatre de l'Opéra. Catalogue Historique, Chronologique, Anecdotique, Tome 1, Paris, Librairie des bibliophiles, 1878 (accessible online in Internet Archive)
 Raffaele Mellace, Fêtes vénitiennes, Les, in Piero Gelli and Filippo Poletti (eds.), Dizionario dell'opera. 2008, Milan, Baldini Castoldi Dalai, 2007, pp. 469–470,  (reproduced online at Opera Manager)
 François and Claude Parfaict, Dictionnaire des Théâtres de Paris, contenant toutes les pièces qui ont été représentées jusqu'à présent sur les différents Théâtres François et sur celui de l'Académie Royale de Musique ..., Paris, Rozet, 1767, VI, pp. 115–129 (accessible for free online in  books.google)
 Spire Pitou, The Paris Opéra. An Encyclopedia of Operas, Ballets, Composers, and Performers – Genesis and Glory, 1671-1715, Greenwood Press, Westport/London, 1983
The Viking Opera Guide ed. Holden (Viking, 1993)
 Le magazine de l'opéra baroque, page: Les fêtes vénitiennes
 

Opéras-ballets
Operas by André Campra
French-language operas
Operas
Opera world premieres at the Paris Opera
1710 operas
Operas set in Venice